Banking in Canada is one of Canada's most important industries with several banks being among its largest and most profitable companies.

It is dominated by a small number of large banks, with the six largest combining for 90% of the market share. The two largest, the Royal Bank of Canada and the Toronto Dominion Bank are among the world's 25 largest banks. It has been considered to be one of the safest and soundest banking systems in the world, and avoided major problems in the Financial crisis of 2007–2008.

Canada's banks have high service levels and investments in technology. A report released by the office of the Minister of Finance in 2002 states "Canada has the highest number of ATMs per capita in the world and benefits from the highest penetration levels of electronic channels such as debit cards, Internet banking and telephone banking". More recent data published by the World Bank shows that as of 2017 Canada has 227.82 ATMs per 100,000 adults, which ranks the country third worldwide.

Early history

Banking in Canada began to migrate in earnest from colonial overseas banking operations to a local banking system with the founding of the Bank of Montreal in 1817. Other banks soon followed and began business, and after a lengthy approval process began unregulated banking business. These institutions issued their own local bank notes as currency. However throughout the 1850s and early 1860s a number of bank failures caused a loss of confidence in bank notes. The passing of The Provincial Notes Act in 1866 allowed federal and provincial governments to begin to introduce their own notes. With the Canadian Confederation taking place in 1867, the new Dominion government gained complete control over currency and banking. In 1871 the federal government passed the Bank Act which started the process of bringing all charted banks in the country under common regulation.  The establishment of the Bank of Canada in 1935 was also an important milestone in banking and monetary governance.

Ranking with other countries
A survey conducted by the World Economic Forum called the Global Competitiveness Report of twelve-thousand corporate executives, in 2008, concluded that Canada has the best banking system in the world, receiving a score of 6.8 out of possible seven. The Canadian banking system has long been regarded by industry experts to be one of the strongest and most stable banking systems in the world. 

The Bank of Montreal has been paying dividends to share holders every year since 1829 ( years ago), Scotiabank since 1833 ( years ago), Toronto-Dominion Bank since 1857 ( years ago), Canadian Imperial Bank of Commerce since 1868 ( years ago) and Royal Bank of Canada since 1870 ( years ago) respectively.

Bank failures

In Canada, only two small regional banks have failed since 1923 when the Home Bank of Canada failed. This was both Canadian Commercial Bank and Northland Bank in September 1985. To put this into perspective there were no bank failures in Canada during the Great Depression, World War II, the 1979 Energy Crisis, the Dot-com Bubble, the Sept 11th Attacks or the Subprime Mortgage Crisis.

On June 4, 1996, the Calgary-based Security Home Mortgage Corporation closed its doors for good. About 2,600 Canadians discovered that their savings were not immediately available from their financial institution, in which they had entrusted a total of $42 million in deposits.

Regulation

Canada's federal government has sole jurisdiction for banks according to the Canadian Constitution, specifically Section 91(15) of The Constitution Act, 1867 (30 & 31 Victoria, c.3 (UK)), formerly known as the British North America Act, 1867. Meanwhile, credit unions/caisses populaires, securities dealers and mutual funds are largely regulated by provincial governments.

The main federal statute for the incorporation and regulation of banks, or chartered banks, is the Bank Act (S.C. 1991, c.46), where Schedules I, II and III of this Act list all banks permitted to operate in Canada under these three distinct categories:

Schedule I: Banks allowed to accept deposits and which are not subsidiaries of a foreign bank. Examples include "The Big Five" banks (as mentioned below); associated brands of the Big Five such as Tangerine and Simplii Financial; and smaller second-tier banks such as National Bank of Canada, Laurentian Bank of Canada, and Canadian Western Bank. Because the Schedule I banks are not subsidiaries of any foreign bank, they are the true domestic banks and are the only banks allowed to receive, hold and enforce a special security interest described and provided for under the Bank Act and known to Canadian lawyers and bankers as the "Bank Act security".
Schedule II: Banks allowed to accept deposits and which are subsidiaries of a foreign bank. Examples include AMEX Bank of Canada, Bank of China (Canada), Citibank Canada, HSBC Bank Canada, ICICI Bank Canada and Walmart Canada Bank. Like the Schedule I banks, the Schedule II banks are incorporated under the Bank Act.
Schedule III: Foreign banks permitted to carry on business in Canada. Examples include Citibank N.A., Bank of America, Capital One, Credit Suisse and Deutsche Bank AG. Unlike the Schedule I and Schedule II banks, the Schedule III banks are NOT incorporated under the Bank Act and they operate in Canada, usually within the country's largest cities (being Toronto, Montreal, Calgary and Vancouver), under certain restrictions mentioned in the Bank Act.

The bank regulator is the Office of the Superintendent of Financial Institutions (best known as OSFI), whose authority stems from the Bank Act. The financial groups are also governed by regulatory bodies (bank regulators, securities regulators, insurance regulators, etc.) in each country in which they operate.

Industry structure

In everyday commerce, the banks in Canada are generally referred to in two categories: the five large national banks (the "Big Five") and smaller second-tier banks (notwithstanding that a large national bank and a smaller second-tier bank may share the same legal status and regulatory classification).

Big Five

The five largest banks in Canada are:
 Royal Bank of Canada (RBC)
 Toronto-Dominion Bank (TD)
 Bank of Nova Scotia (Scotiabank)
 Bank of Montreal (BMO)
 Canadian Imperial Bank of Commerce (CIBC)

The financial sector of Canada is especially concentrated in these banks, which has been seen as a result of protectionist policies of the government and the country's small and dispersed population. These banks grew at an extraordinary rate of 10.7 percent per year, on average, from 2008 to 2018 compared with 3.64 percent for the five largest U.S. banks.

While most Canadian banks operate only within Canada, the Big Five are best described as Canadian multinational financial conglomerates that each have a large Canadian banking division. In fiscal 2007, RBC's Canadian segment called "Personal Financial Services" (the segment most related to what was traditionally thought of as retail banking) had revenue of only CAD$5,082 million (or 22.6%) of a total revenue of CAD$22,462 million. Canadian retail operations of the Big Five comprise other activities that do not need to be operated from a regulated bank. These other activities include mutual funds, insurance, credit cards, and brokerage activities. In addition, they have large international subsidiaries. The Canadian banking operations of the Big Five are largely conducted out of each parent company, unlike U.S. banks that use a holding company structure to hold their primary retail banking subsidiaries.

Business lines and brands

*Marketing brands are shown rather than division names. For example, for internal and investor relation purposes, CIBC uses CIBC Retail Markets as a division name, but this does not normally appear in advertisements and does not feature prominently on account statements. Brand names are sometimes used across legal entities within a financial group. Intermediate umbrella brands (such as RBC Investments that includes the brands RBC Funds, RBC Action Direct, and RBC Dominion Securities) are not shown.

Second tier
Notable second-tier banks include Canadian Western Bank, National Bank of Canada, Laurentian Bank, HSBC Bank Canada, which in November 2022 was taken over by RBC, and Tangerine Bank (formerly ING Bank of Canada and now a wholly owned subsidiary of Scotiabank). These second-tier organizations are largely Canadian domestic banking organizations or Canadian subsidiaries of foreign banks. Insurance companies in Canada have also created deposit-taking bank subsidiaries (for example Manulife Bank of Canada), and two notable non-bank consumer financial institutions are ATB Financial (a provincial financial institution owned by the Government of Alberta that operates similarly to a bank) and the Desjardins Group (an alliance of credit unions).

Between July and September 2016, three new domestic Schedule 1 banks (Wealth One Bank of Canada, Exchange Bank of Canada, and UNI Financial Corp) have begun operating in Canada with an additional fourth bank poised to announce its commencement in the following month. When the fourth bank begins operations (Impak Finance Inc), it will be almost a 15% increase in domestic banks from 27 to 31. The new banks have identified niches compared to the wider reach of the "Big Five". Wealth One Bank of Canada aims to service the country's growing Chinese Canadian population with full Mandarin and Cantonese supported speakers. Exchange Bank of Canada deals exclusively in foreign currency services on a wholesale level to financial institutions and businesses. UNI Financial Corp. was formed as Caisses populaires acadiennes become the first Canadian credit union to obtain a federal bank charter.

Financial crisis of 2008
During the peak of the 2008 financial crisis, the Bank of Canada, along with the Canada Mortgage and Housing Corporation and the US Federal Reserve provided up to $114 billion of liquidity support to Canadian banks. Of this amount, $69 billion was part of the CMHC mortgage insurance program, a facility set up in 1954 to handle such situations.

The World Economic Forum, In the 2010-2011 report Canada ranked 1st in the "Soundness of banks" indicator ranking as the world's soundest banking system for six consecutive years (2007-2013) according to reports by the World Economic Forum. Released in October 2010, Global Finance magazine put Royal Bank of Canada at number 10 among the world's safest banks and Toronto-Dominion Bank at number 15.

Dispute resolution

Since the late 1990s, dispute resolution across the sector was directed to the independent Ombudsman for Banking Services and Investments (OSBI). As of 2018, Royal Bank of Canada, Toronto-Dominion Bank and Scotiabank direct dispute resolution to the for-profit Chambers Banking Ombuds Office (ADRBO). As reported in The Globe and Mail in 2018, "[t]he Canadian Foundation for Advancement of Investor Rights (FAIR) has compared ADRBO unfavourably with OBSI," noting a statement from FAIR that they "have serious concerns about the conflicts of interest, misaligned incentives, and level of transparency and accountability at ADRBO". In 2018, John Lawford, executive director of consumer rights group the Public Interest Advocacy Centre, criticized ADRBO for not "[adhering] to the same openness principles" that OBSI brought to the table, adding that customer's are likely to experience "less success with their banking complaints" at ADRBO as a result. As of 2021, National Bank of Canada and Digital Commerce Bank are also reported to use ADRBO. In 2021, concerning an incident where TD Bank was able to find records that RSP funds has been transferred out of a customer's account, but not find records as to where they had gone, Duff Conacher, cofounder of accountability group Democracy Watch, observed that "most of Canada's big banks are avoiding accountability by essentially policing themselves when it comes to consumer complaints."

See also

 Canada Deposit Insurance Corporation
 Canadian and American economies compared
 Canadian Bankers Association
 Credit unions in Canada
 FATCA agreement between Canada and the United States
 List of banks and credit unions in Canada
 Routing number (Canada)

Notes

Citation

Further reading

External links
 Financial Institutions and Markets, Department of Finance, URL accessed 6 August 2006
 Department of Justice website, Department of Justice, URL accessed 26 January 2014
 OSFI website, Office of the Superintendent of Financial Institutions, URL accessed 2 November 2006